Placocrea is a genus of fungi in the family Mycosphaerellaceae; according to the 2007 Outline of Ascomycota, the placement in this family is uncertain.

References 

Mycosphaerellaceae genera
Dothideomycetes genera